The Kosa (Komi: Кöсва) is a river in Perm Krai, Russia, a right tributary of the Kama. The Kosa freezes up in late October or November and stays icebound until April or early May. It starts in the extreme south of Kosinsky District and flows north. The mouth of the river is near the village of Ust-Kosa. Banks are lowland. There are swamp Ydzhidnyur in the basin of the Kosa.

Main tributaries:
Left: Yancher, Sepol, Onolva, Lolog, Odan, Sym
Right: Yum, Lopva, Lopan, Lolym, Siya, Bulach.

Etymology  
The name of the river is composed of the Komi-Permyak words ‘kös’ (dry) and ‘va’ (water), that can be translated as ‘dry water’. Komi-Permyak people call the river ‘Kösva’.

References  

Rivers of Perm Krai